Elizabeth Geertruida Agatha Dyson ( Weersma, 15 January 1897 – 17 October 1951), known as Hedda Dyson, was a New Zealand journalist and magazine editor. She was born in Ginneken, Netherlands on 15 January 1897.

References

1897 births
1951 deaths
People from Breda
New Zealand people of Dutch descent
Dutch emigrants to New Zealand
20th-century New Zealand women writers
20th-century New Zealand writers
20th-century New Zealand journalists